The thoracolumbar fascia (lumbodorsal fascia or thoracodorsal fascia) is a deep investing membrane throughout most of the posterior thorax and abdomen although it is a thin fibrous lamina in the thoracic region. Above, it is continuous with a similar investing layer on the back of the neck—the nuchal fascia.

It is formed of longitudinal and transverse fibers that bridge the aponeuroses of internal oblique and transversus, costal angles and iliac crest laterally, to the vertebral column and sacrum medially. In doing so, they cover the paravertebral muscles.

It is made up of three layers, anterior, middle, and posterior. The anterior and middle layers insert onto the transverse processes of the vertebral column while the posterior layer inserts onto the tips of the spinous processes, hence it is indirectly continuous with the interspinous ligaments.

The anterior layer is the thinnest and the posterior layer is the thickest.  Two spaces are formed between these three layers of the fascia. 
 Psoas major lies anterior to the anterior layer, with the anterior fascia of this muscle being continuous with the vertebral body and thus the anterior longitudinal ligament.
 Between the anterior and middle layer lies the quadratus lumborum muscle.
 The erector spinae muscles and the transversospinales muscles are then enclosed between the middle and posterior layers.  
 Various superficial muscle layers on the posterior thorax and abdomen then arise from the posterior layer. These primarily include latissimus dorsi and serratus posterior inferior.

See also
 Erector spinae muscles

References

External links
  - "Thoracolumbar Fascia, Dissection, Posterior View"
  - "Trunk, Transverse MRI Showing Lamellae of the Thoracolumbar Fascia"

Thorax (human anatomy)
Fascial spaces of the head and neck